Strabena argyrina is a butterfly in the family Nymphalidae. It is found on Madagascar. The habitat consists of natural grassland and marshlands.

References

Strabena
Butterflies described in 1878
Endemic fauna of Madagascar
Butterflies of Africa
Taxa named by Paul Mabille